Daniel Larsson may refer to:

Daniel Larsson (ice hockey) (born 1986), Swedish ice hockey goaltender
Daniel Larsson (footballer) (born 1987), Swedish footballer
Daniel Larsson (darts player) (born 1981), Swedish darts player

See also
Dan Larson (born 1954), baseball pitcher
Daniel Larsen (disambiguation)